Huntspill is a village on the Huntspill Level in Somerset, England. The village is the principal settlement in the civil parish of West Huntspill. In 2019 it had an estimated population of 1102.

History
The first mention of Huntspill is around 796 AD, when the area was granted to Glastonbury Abbey by Aethelmund, a nobleman
under King Offa of Mercia.

Huntspill was listed in the Domesday Book of 1086 as Honspil, meaning 'Huna's Pill' (possibly from the Old English personal name Huna). The Welsh word Pîl, is a common element along the Somerset coast denoting a tidal inlet suitable as a harbour.

The parish of Huntspill was part of the Huntspill and Puriton Hundred,

The mouth of the River Brue had an extensive harbour in Roman and Saxon times, before silting up in the medieval period.  A new wharf, known as Clyce Wharf, was built on the Huntspill side of the river mouth by 1904, and was used for the import of coal and the export of bricks and tiles and agricultural products.  The wharf closed in 1949.

The village was flooded in the Bristol Channel floods of 1607.

In 1936 the village was the centre of an outbreak of Typhoid fever in which seven people died.

The ancient parish of Huntspill also included the villages of East Huntspill, Hackness and Bason Bridge, east of the village of Huntspill.  The western boundary of the parish was the tidal River Parrett, but changes in the course of the river left some parts of the parish on the west side of the river until 1933, when they were transferred to the civil parish of Otterhampton.  In 1885 the uninhabited Stert Island in Bridgwater Bay was transferred from the parish of Stogursey to Huntspill, but the island was also transferred to Otterhampton in 1933.

In 1949 the civil parish of Huntspill was abolished and divided into the civil parishes of West Huntspill and Huntspill All Saints (renamed East Huntspill in 1972) along the line of the Bristol and Exeter Railway.

Governance

The parish council has responsibility for local issues, including setting an annual precept (local rate) to cover the council's operating costs and producing annual accounts for public scrutiny. The parish council evaluates local planning applications and works with the local police, district council officers, and neighbourhood watch groups on matters of crime, security, and traffic. The parish council's role also includes initiating projects for the maintenance and repair of parish facilities, as well as consulting with the district council on the maintenance, repair, and improvement of highways, drainage, footpaths, public transport, and street cleaning. Conservation matters (including trees and listed buildings) and environmental issues are also the responsibility of the council.

The village falls within the Non-metropolitan district of Sedgemoor, which was formed on 1 April 1974 under the Local Government Act 1972, having previously been part of Bridgwater Rural District, which is responsible for local planning and building control, local roads, council housing, environmental health, markets and fairs, refuse collection and recycling, cemeteries and crematoria, leisure services, parks, and tourism.

Somerset County Council is responsible for running the largest and most expensive local services such as education, social services, libraries, main roads, public transport, policing and  fire services, trading standards, waste disposal and strategic planning.

The village falls within the 'Huntspill and Pawlett' electoral ward. As is indicated by the name Pawlett is also included within the ward. The total population at the 2011 census was 2,171.

It is also part of the Bridgwater and West Somerset county constituency represented in the House of Commons of the Parliament of the United Kingdom. It elects one Member of Parliament (MP) by the first past the post system of election.

Religious sites
The Church of St Peter was established by 1208, rebuilt around 1400, and extended in the early to mid 15th century. It was gutted by fire in 1878 and restored over the next two years. It has been designated as a Grade I listed building.

Notable people
Thomas Brewer (1868-?), first-class cricketer

See also
 Huntspill River
 River Brue
 River Parrett

References

The People of the Parish (2001). The Book of West Huntspill: A Millennium Celebration. Tiverton, Devon: Halsgrove Publishing.

External links

 A History of the County of Somerset: Volume 8: The Poldens and the Levels: Huntspill  (2004)
 The Somerset Urban Archaeological Survey: Burnham and Highbridge  by Clare Gathercole

Villages in Sedgemoor
Former civil parishes in Somerset
Somerset Levels